The 2007 Qantas Television Awards were presented on Saturday 24 November, in a ceremony at the Aotea Centre in Auckland, New Zealand, celebrating the year in New Zealand television and television media. The awards were hosted by television presenters Jason Gunn and Petra Bagust, with entertainment from the Auckland Philharmonia Orchestra, Evermore, Candy Lane and the Qantas Cure Kids Choir.

Winners

The Qantas Television Awards were announced on Saturday 24 November 2007.

News and Current Affairs Winners

Best News
 3 News (TV3)

Best News or Current Affairs Presenter
Mark Sainsbury, Close Up (TV One)

Best News Reporting
 3 News "Benson Pope" (TV3)

Best Current Affairs Reporting for a Weekly Programme or One Off Current Affairs Special
 Sunday "The Tiler’s Tale" (TV One)

Best Current Affairs Reporting for a Daily Programme
Campbell Live "Spider" (TV3)

Best Current Affairs Series
 60 Minutes "Episode 20" (TV3)

Investigation of the Year
 3 News "Let us Spray" (TV3)

TV Journalist of the Year
Duncan Garner, 3 News (TV3)

News and Current Affairs Craft Winners

Best News Camera
Christopher Brown, One News (TV One)

Best Current Affairs Camera
Mike Dodd, Sunday (TV One)

Best News/Current Affairs Editing
Andrew Gibb, Sunday (TV One)

General Television Winners

Best Actor in a TV Drama
Antony Starr, Outrageous Fortune (TV3)

Best Actress in a TV Drama
Robyn Malcolm Outrageous Fortune (TV3)

Best Drama
 Outrageous Fortune "Xmas Special" (TV3)

Best Script (non-factual)
James Griffin, Outrageous Fortune (TV3)

Best Director (drama)
Nathan Price, The Hothouse (TV One)

Best Arts/ Festival Documentary
 Love, Speed and Loss (TV3)

Best Children’s/Youth Programme
' Let's Get Inventin' - "Magic Gadget" (TV2)Best Comedy Pulp Sport "Episode 7" (TV3)Best Entertainment Dancing with the Stars "Episode 1" (TV One)Best Information/ Lifestyle Fair Go "Episode 3" (TV One)Best Popular Documentary The Time of our Lives (TV3)Best Reality (format) Marae DIY (Maori TV)Best Sports or Event Coverage The 32nd America’s Cup "The Build-up & Race 1 Valencia" (TV One)Best Observational Reality (non format) Emergency "Episode 2" (TV One)Best Director (non-drama)Melanie Rakena, ICE (TV One)General Television Craft Winners

Best Editing (factual)Simon Coldrick, NZSAS: First Among Equals(TV3)Best Camera (factual)Jacob Bryant, Ends of the Earth (TV One)Best Camera (non-factual)Simon Baumfield, The Hothouse (TV One)Best Editing (non-factual)Bryan Shaw, Outrageous Fortune (TV3)Woman’s Day People’s Choice Awards 2007

Favourite NZ Female PersonalityRobyn MalcolmFavourite NZ Male PersonalityMarc EllisFavourite NZ Show Outrageous Fortune Favourite International Show Grey’s Anatomy '''

References

New Zealand television awards
Qantas Television Awards
Awards
2000s in New Zealand cinema